Adil Raza (born 10 December 1991) is a Pakistani first-class cricketer. He was part of Pakistan's squad for the 2008 Under-19 Cricket World Cup.

References

External links
 

1991 births
Living people
Pakistani cricketers
Sui Northern Gas Pipelines Limited cricketers
People from Gujranwala
United Bank Limited cricketers